Apple Jack is an Xbox Live game developed by British independent developer Tim Sycamore under the name My Owl Software. The game was published in May 2010. It is a 2D puzzle-platform game.

The game's plot revolves around Apple Jack rescuing his dog from Mount Snowdon in Wales. There are 5 counties depicted in the game with each one having 20 levels in total. The gameplay controls similar to Super Mario Bros.. The game is known to get progressively difficult with very few managing to complete the game. The game was one of the most popular Xbox Live Indie Game at the time. The game had estimated 250 ratings as of 2017. Apple Jack also had a sequel. Even though Apple Jack was very popular at one point, the game has fallen into obscurity and is not very well known in the gaming community.

References

External links
Developer's website
Apple Jack at Xbox.com
 Review at Eurogamer.net
 Review at Digital Spy
 Review at ArmlessOctopus
 Review at gaygame
 Review at xnplay

2010 video games
Microsoft games
Xbox 360 Live Indie games
Xbox 360-only games
Xbox 360 games
Puzzle-platform games
Video games developed in the United Kingdom
Video games set in Wales

Single-player video games